Robert Houston Broyles (January 20, 1933 - February 12, 2011) was an American character actor, drama teacher, theatre director, and writer. He was sometimes billed as Bob Broyles or Bobby Broyles.

Early life
Broyles was born in Sparta, Tennessee, on January 20, 1933. He grew up in White County, Tennessee. His parents were Elise A. Bennette and Robert Lee Broyles Jr.

He served in the U. S. Navy from 1952 to 1956. He then attended Ohio State University and earned a Bachelor of Arts degree in 1960. From 1963 to 1967, he was a drama coach in Hollywood. He made his first television appearance in 1964 on Bonanza in the episode "The Cheating Game" as Tom, one of the ranch hands.

Career
In the late 1960s, he began to appear on many television shows, appearing three times each on My Three Sons and The Mod Squad, and twice on Family Affair. During this time, he appeared in one movie called "Fever Heat." He began to appear in more films, including Eat My Dust, Close Encounters of The Third Kind, Norma Rae, and Poltergeist. Broyles continued appearing on television shows and movies throughout the 1970s and 1980s. He returned to working as a drama coach in Los Angeles from 1982 to 1987. He appeared in the Andy Griffith Show reunion movie Return to Mayberry in 1986, sharing a comical boat scene with Don Knotts.

Besides working as an actor in theatre, he also worked as a writer and director. He wrote the plays "Sparta" in 1975 and "Natural Affection" in 1989 and wrote the novel "Agness" in 1977. In 1974, he was voted best actor in Los Angeles for his work in the play "Tennessee Williams" and was voted best director in Los Angeles for "Three by Tennessee Plus." He also directed the play "The Love Talker" in 1994. The play was written by Deborah Pryor and starred Colleen Cochran, Ebba-Marie Gendron, and Donald Wayne Jarman.

Broyles made very few appearances on television and in movies in the 1990s but continued to offer acting classes called Total Acting Class. His last role was in 2000 on the short-lived television show Bette starring Bette Midler. He passed away at the age of 78 in Los Angeles in 2011.

Filmography
Fever Heat (1968) as Loren Peale
Eat My Dust (1976) as Bud the Driver
Poco: Little Dog Lost (1977) as Deputy Sheriff Bob
Close Encounters of the Third Kind (1977) as Dirty Tricks #3
Record City (1978) as Workman
Born Again (1978) as John Erlichman
Norma Rae (1979) as Sam Bolen
Friendly Fire (1979, TV Movie)
Raise The Titanic (1980) as Willis
Poltergeist (1982) as Pool Worker #1
Memorial Day (1983, TV Movie) as Preacher
Why Me? (1984, TV Movie)
California Girls (1985, TV Movie) as Limo Driver
A Death in California (1985, TV Mini-Series) as Bradley Taylor
Copacabana (1985, TV Movie) as Bar Patron
Acceptable Risks (1986, TV Movie) as Second Councilman
Return to Mayberry (1986, TV Movie) as Wilson
Inherit The Wind (1988, TV Movie) as Man on Platform
The Karen Carpenter Story (1989, TV Movie) as Bowl Emcee
Sonny Boy (1989) as Mayor
My Boyfriend's Back (1989, TV Movie) as Man in Lounge (credited as Bob Broyles)
Fall From Grace (1990, TV Movie) as Construction Foreman
Tom Clancy's Op Center (1995, TV Movie) as Chief

Television
Bonanza – episode – The Cheating Game (1964) as Tom
Family Affair – episode – The Prize (1967) as messenger boy
Family Affair – episode – Your Friend, Jody (1968) as counselor
My Three Sons – episode – The Baby Nurse (1968) as John Hawkins
The Mod Squad – episode – A Run for the Money (1969) as police officer Kent
The Mod Squad – episode – The Debt (1969) as policeman
The Mod Squad – episode – The Loser (1970) as police sergeant
My Three Sons – episode – You Can't Go Home (1970) as policeman
My Three Sons – episode – The Honeymoon (1970) as Max
The High Chaparral – episode – The Badge (1970) as Loosh
Mission: Impossible – episode – Nerves (1971) as mechanic
The Streets of San Francisco – episode – Bitter Wine (1972) as Paul Croft
Diana – episode – Who's Minding The Cat (1973) as Burf (credited as Bobby Broyles)
Shazam – episode – The Road Back (1974) as officer
Korg: 70,000 B.C. - episode - The Picture Maker (1974) as Moon's father
Cannon – episode – Nightmare (1975) as Harold Kircher
The Rockford Files – episode – The Aaron Ironwood School of Success (1975) as Hauss
Police Woman – episode – The Melting Point of Ice (1976) as bartender
Police Story – episode – Stigma (1977) as Hoby Simmons
Lou Grant – episode – Babies (1978) as motel clerk
The Bad News Bears – episode – Lights Out (1980) as clerk
Flamingo Road – episode – Illicit Weekend (1981)
Fantasy Island – episode – The Big Bet/Nancy and the Thunderbirds (1982) as the director
The Dukes of Hazzard – episode – Big Brothers, Duke (1983) as The Man
AfterMASH – episode – Les Misérables (1984) as bailiff
The Wonderful World of Disney – episode – The Girl Who Spelled Freedom (1986) as Jim
Matlock – episode – The Nurse (NBC) (1987) as Mark, the mechanic
Square One TV: Mathnet – episode – Problem of the Passing Parade (1987) as man at dry cleaners (credited as Bob Broyles)
Hart To Hart – episode – Home Is Where The Hart Is (1994) as Fred
Bette – episode – And The Winner Is (2000) as older man (final appearance)

References

External links
 
 
 Boot Hill: RIP Robert Broyles
 The High Chaparral – photo of Robert Broyles

1933 births
2011 deaths
Male actors from Tennessee
American male film actors
American male television actors
People from Sparta, Tennessee
20th-century American male actors